Ogre (population 26,573 in 2000 census) is the state city in Ogre Municipality (and previously Ogre District) in the Vidzeme region of Latvia,  east of the capital Riga, situated at the confluence of the Daugava and Ogre rivers. It has been a city since 1928. The population in 2020 was 23,273.

Ogre is composed of three parts: Jaunogre (meaning "New Ogre"), Ogre (the center of the city), and Pārogre (meaning "Ogre across [the river]" though not all of the named region is across the river).

The name of the city comes from the Ogre river. The Ogre village was first mentioned in 1206, called "Oger" in German.
In 1861, when a railway Riga–Daugavpils was built, Riga's residents started to build summer cottages here. In 1862 Ogre became a health resort.

The city's coat of arms was granted in 1938 and shows the beautiful river and pinewoods of Ogre.
There is a cultural centre, an art school and a music school in Ogre. It has three Latvian language schools, and one Russian language school — Jaunogre Secondary School.

The city also has a cemetery with the remains of German soldiers who died during the First and Second World Wars, or died in captivity between 1944 and 1951.

Ogre is the homecity for most recent (2016/17) Latvian ice hockey champions HK Kurbads.

Etymology 
There are three main versions of the etymology of Ogre's name (both town and river). The first states that the name of the river from which this city derives its name is of Russian origin (угри, ugri, meaning "eels") because there used to be many eels in the river Ogre. A popular folk legend says that Catherine the Great of Russia was the one who gave the river this name because there were a lot of eels in the river; however, this lacks any evidence.
Whereas Estonian linguist Paul Alvre takes into consideration an older form of the Ogre river's name (Wogene, Woga) first found in Livonian Chronicle of Henry (1180–1227), and argues that it cognates with Estonian word voog (with possible meanings: "stream, flow, waves"), therefore showing connection with Finno-Ugric languages, most probably early Livonian language.

A third etymology gives a reconstructed form *Vingrē, related to Lithuanian vingrùs, "meandering, curly" or Latvian vingrs, "nimble;" thus meaning "the meandering river"; the village of Engure has the same root.

Sports
Ice hockey, basketball and handball are the most popular sports in Ogre.

Ice hockey club Essamika won the only Latvian Hockey Higher League championship title up to this day. In the later years Ogre has got 8 silver medals: 5 with ASK/Ogre and 3 with HK Kurbads.

Ogre has a Latvian Basketball League and Baltic Basketball League team, BK Ogre/Kumho Tyre, which entered the Latvian highest league after winning the gold in Latvian second league.

Ogre's handball team HK Ogre/Miandum has won multiple medals in the Latvian Handball Higher League and won the silver medal at the 2013–14 season as the highest achievement.

FK Ogre, the city's main association football club, plays in the Latvian First League.

Twin towns – sister cities
See twin towns of Ogre Municipality.

References

Sources
 Alvre, Paul Eesti ja liivi keeleaines Henriku Liivimaa kroonikas (III) (Keel ja Kirjandus, 1985)

External links

  

 
Cities in Latvia
Republican cities of Latvia
1929 establishments in Latvia
Populated places established in 1929
Ogre Municipality
Vidzeme